Emmanuelle Laborit (born 18 October 1971) is a deaf French actress. She appeared in more than ten films since 1994. Marianna Ucriya, An Air So Pure, Beyond Silence and Still Liebe are some of them. She is married to Jean Darlic, a French theatre and cine artist.

Selected filmography

References

External links 

1971 births
Living people
French film actresses
Deaf actresses
French deaf people
20th-century French actresses
21st-century French actresses